The Yugoslavia men's national volleyball team was the national team of Socialist Federal Republic of Yugoslavia.

Results

Olympic Games

World Championship

European Championship

World Cup
1965 — 8th place
1969–1991 — did not qualify

World League
1990 — did not qualify
1991 — did not qualify

Mediterranean Games
1959 — did not participate
1963 —  1st place
1967 —  1st place
1971 —  1st place
1975 —  1st place
1979 —  1st place
1983 — did not participate
1987 — 4th place
1991 —  2nd place

Notable Squads
1975 European Championship
Miloš Grbić, Miodrag Gvozdenović, Nikola Matijašević, Vinko Dobrić, Laslo Lukač, Aleksandar Boričić, Vladimir Bogoevski, Vladimir Bošnjak, Ivica Jelić, Slobodan Lozančić, Mirsad Elezović, Živojin Vračarić, coach: Lazar Grozdanović

1979 European Championship
Ljubomir Travica, Goran Srbinovski, Slobodan Lozančić, Vladimir Trifunović, Miodrag Mitić, Aleksandar Tasevski, Radovan Malević, Boro Jović, Vladimir Bogoevski, Vinko Dobrić, Zdravko Kuljić, Dragan Nišić, coach: Drago Tomić

1980 Olympic Games
Vladimir Bogoevski, Ivica Jelić, Boro Jović, Mladen Kašić, Zdravko Kuljić, Slobodan Lozančić, Radovan Malević, Miodrag Mitić, Goran Srbinovski, Aleksandar Tasevski, Ljubomir Travica, Vladimir Trifunović

See also

 Yugoslavia women's national volleyball team
 Bosnia and Herzegovina men's national volleyball team
 Croatia men's national volleyball team
 Montenegro men's national volleyball team
 North Macedonia men's national volleyball team
 Serbia men's national volleyball team
 Serbia women's national volleyball team
 Slovenia men's national volleyball team

Former notable players
 Ivica Jelić
 Vladimir Janković
 Miloš Grbić
 Miodrag Gvozdenović
 Laslo Lukač
 Vladimir Trifunović
 Slavko Balandžić
 Orhan Arslanagić
 Mirsad Imširović
 Slobodan Boškan
 Toni Stipaničev

References

National men's volleyball teams
Vol
Men
Men's sport in Yugoslavia